Jean-Marc Bosman (born 30 October 1964) is a Belgian former professional footballer who played as a midfielder. His judicial challenge of the football transfer rules led to the Bosman ruling in 1995.

This landmark judgement, which was handed down by the European Court of Justice, completely changed the way footballers are employed, allowing professional players in the European Union to move freely to another club at the end of their contract with their present team.

Career and trial

Prior to the landmark trial for which he became known, Bosman played for Belgian first division club Standard Liège and RFC Liège, and also won 20 caps for Belgium at youth level, even captaining the under-21 side for a time. He joined the former club in 1983, before moving to RFC Liège in 1988. When his contract with the latter club had expired two years later, he attempted to join French club Dunkerque in 1990, at the age of 25; however, Liège valued him at a fee of approximately £500,000, and insisted that the French club pay in full up front. When they refused, Liège refused to agree to the transfer, and cut Bosman's wages by 75% to £500 per month. This led Bosman to challenge the system legally and bring his case to court; he sued Liège, the Belgian FA, and UEFA, arguing that the rules set out by UEFA, which prevented him from leaving his club even though his contract had expired, amounted to a breach of his rights established in the 1957 Treaty of Rome, which allowed freedom of movement within the European Community, now the European Union. As a result, his club suspended him. While the trial was ongoing Bosman played briefly in the French lower leagues for second division club Saint-Quentin, and on the Indian Ocean island of Réunion. On 15 December 1995, the European Court of Justice ruled that players should be free to move when their contracts had expired, and that EU clubs could hire any number of European Union players.

After the ruling
Despite the legal victory, Bosman faced significant financial and personal difficulties following the landmark trial. In a 2011 interview, he claimed that the compensation he earned from FIFPro and the courts were largely spent on legal fees, which ultimately left him bankrupt; furthermore, his marriage also ended during his legal battles and trial. Some of his money was also lost due to a bad investment in a special T-shirt line. Bosman hoped that the players who benefited from the Bosman ruling would support him by buying one of his "Who's the Boz" T-shirts. He sold only one, to the son of his lawyer. He also hoped to play a testimonial match, which eventually fell through, however, although he ultimately played a match against Lille in front of only approximately 2,000 spectators. In order to pay his taxes, he was forced to sell his second house and his Porsche Carrera. He struggled to find work after the ruling, and ended up living on welfare; as a result of his financial difficulties and his claimed ostracism by the world of football, Bosman fell into depression and also struggled with alcoholism.

In April 2013 Bosman was given a one-year suspended prison sentence following an assault on both his girlfriend at the time and her 15-year-old daughter, allegedly over his then girlfriend's refusal to give him an alcoholic drink in 2011; it was later reduced to community service on appeal.

As of 2015, Bosman was unemployed and relying on handouts from FIFPro.

Personal life
Bosman has two sons, the elder Martin, and the younger Samuel.

References

External links
 FamousBelgians.net: Jean-Marc Bosman
 Uefa.com abridged interview: 2005 Interview with Jean-Marc Bosman
 BosmanRuling.co.uk

1964 births
Living people
Belgian footballers
Footballers from Liège
Standard Liège players
RFC Liège players
Ligue 2 players
Belgian Pro League players
Belgian prisoners and detainees
Prisoners and detainees of Belgium
Olympique Saint-Quentin players
Association football midfielders